Diisopropyl paraoxon is an organophosphate that inhibits the acetylcholinesterase. It is the isopropyl analog of paraoxon.

Diisopropyl paraoxon is insoluble in water, but it is soluble in ethanol.

See also
Diisopropyl fluorophosphate
Paraoxon

References

Acetylcholinesterase inhibitors
Organophosphates
Phenol esters
Nitrobenzenes
Isopropyl esters